Javier Matías Pastore (born 20 June 1989) is an Argentine professional footballer who plays as an attacking midfielder for Qatar Stars League club Qatar SC.

Pastore began his club career with Talleres and then Huracán in his native Argentina before moving to Serie A team Palermo in 2009 for a reported transfer fee of €4.7 million. In 2011, French side Paris Saint-Germain bought him for a reported €39.8 million. He won numerous domestic honours with the club, including five Ligue 1 titles, before joining Roma in 2018, for a fee of €24.7 million.

At international level, Pastore made his senior debut in 2010, and went on to make over 20 appearances for his country. He represented Argentina at the 2010 FIFA World Cup, and at three editions of the Copa América, reaching consecutive finals of the latter competition in 2015 and 2016.

Club career

Early life
Pastore was born in Córdoba in an Italian-Argentine family originally from Volvera, Turin. He started his career in the youth system of the Argentine club Talleres, and slowly worked his way up to the first team. In 2007, he made his debut in the Argentine second division under the wing of manager Ricardo Gareca. In 2007, he only managed to play five games.

Huracán
During the 2008 season, Pastore was loaned to Huracán of the Argentine Primera. He made his professional debut for Huracán on 24 May 2008 in a 1–0 loss with River Plate. In the 2009 Clausura championship, he established himself as a regular first-team player for the club under the management of Ángel Cappa. This was his breakthrough tournament, where his side narrowly missed out on the championship title. His performance against River Plate was particularly lauded where he opened the scoring with a 25-yard shot and then scored again with a piece of individual brilliance helping Huracán win 4–0 in the club's biggest win against River Plate in over 60 years. He ended up as the team's top scorer with seven goals and three assists. Pastore and teammate Matías De Federico was integral to Huracán's title challenge that season.

Palermo
On 11 July 2009 Palermo formally announced the signing of Pastore for five years until 30 June 2014, with the transfer fee listed at approximately €4.7 million. Before his move to Palermo, the player was also linked to number of other top European clubs, including Manchester United, Porto, Milan and Chelsea.

Pastore's debut was on 15 August in the Coppa Italia, while his debut in Serie A came eight days later. His breakthrough game was on 4 October against Juventus, when he assisted Edinson Cavani's goal in a 2–0 win, appearing in all the websites and national newspapers. He scored his first Serie A goal on 30 January 2010 in a 2–4 away defeat to Bari. In his first season at Palermo, Pastore proved himself as being a promising but inexperienced youngster, playing mostly as a second-half substitute under head coaches Walter Zenga and, later, Delio Rossi.

Pastore then established himself as a regular under the tutelage of Rossi, playing usually in a role behind the regular striking duo of Fabrizio Miccoli and Edinson Cavani. Thanks to his performances, all praised by fans and pundits, Palermo finished off the season in fifth place, thus qualifying for the UEFA Europa League. In the 2010–11 season, on 14 November, Pastore scored his first career hat-trick in a derby match against Catania. On 30 July 2011, Palermo club president Maurizio Zamparini revealed that a fee had been agreed over Javier Pastore's transfer to Paris Saint-Germain.

Paris Saint-Germain

On 6 August 2011, Paris Saint-Germain formally announced the signing of Pastore, issuing him the number 27 shirt. The transfer fee throughout was €39.8 million. However, due to third-party ownership by his agent Marcelo Simonian, who would receive €12.5 million (not known if it included agent fee or not) Palermo announced through its website that the club received only €22.8 million of the total fee.

Palermo club president Maurizio Zamparini had started a legal action over the matter, despite the Italian Football Federation (FIGC) prohibiting any Italian club from forming any ownership agreement with third parties, which Zamparini acknowledged risked a punishment for himself.

Pastore scored his first goal in a Ligue 1 match against Brest in a 1–0 win on 11 September 2011.

During his first season at the Parc des Princes, Pastore scored 13 goals in 33 league matches. The following year, Pastore appeared in 34 league matches as PSG won the first of four consecutive Ligue 1 titles. He also scored his first UEFA Champions League goal in a 4–1 win over FC Dynamo Kyiv on 18 September 2012.

In 2014–15, Pastore made over 50 appearances and was named in the UNFP team of the season as PSG won an unprecedented domestic quadruple of Ligue 1, the Coupe de France, Coupe de la Ligue and the Trophée des Champions.

Ahead of the 2016–17 season, Pastore inherited the number 10 shirt from the departing Zlatan Ibrahimović, switching from the number 27 shirt. As with 2015–16, he missed a large portion of the season through injuries, but returned to the PSG starting line-up for Le Classique against rivals Olympique de Marseille, where he assisted Edinson Cavani in a 5–1 Ligue 1 away win on 26 February 2017. Three days later, he came on as a substitute and scored the opening goal, before assisting Cavani again as PSG defeated Ligue 2 club Chamois Niortias 2–0 to reach the quarter-final stage of the 2016–17 Coupe de France. On 19 March 2017, Pastore assisted both of PSG's goals by crossing the ball to the scorers Adrien Rabiot and Julian Draxler in their 2–1 Ligue 1 home win over Lyon.

On 17 May 2017, Pastore appeared as a 72nd-minute substitute for Julian Draxler as PSG defeated Angers 1–0 in the 2017 Coupe de France Final.

Before the start of the next season, he vacated his number 10 jersey to new signing Neymar as a welcome gift and reclaimed his previous number 27 jersey.

On 8 May 2018, he came off the bench as PSG won 2–0 against Les Herbiers VF to clinch the 2017–18 Coupe de France.

Roma
On 26 June 2018, Pastore signed a five-year contract with Italian side Roma from Paris Saint-Germain for a reported fee of €24.7m. He was handed the number 27 shirt. He made his club debut in a 1–0 away win over Torino in Serie A on 19 August. He scored his first goal for the club on 27 August, opening the scoring with a back-heeled goal in the second minute of play in an eventual 3–3 home draw against Atalanta in the league.

On 30 August 2021, he mutually terminated his contract with Roma.

Elche
On 4 September 2021, Pastore signed for La Liga club Elche on a one-year contract.

In January 2023, Pastore announced that his Elche contract had been terminated by mutual consent and he was leaving the club.

Qatar SC
On 11 January 2023, Qatar Stars League club Qatar SC announced the signing of free agent Pastore.

International career
Following a string of good performances in his first season in Serie A, Argentina head coach Diego Maradona called up Pastore for an unofficial friendly match against the Catalonia "national" team on 22 December 2009. Pastore made his debut as a second-half substitute, scoring a goal in the process. Since the match was not a FIFA-recognized representative game, however, Pastore did not receive a cap.

Pastore was subsequently called up by Maradona again for a friendly game against Germany, but did not make an appearance. His official debut was against Canada on 25 May 2010, and he was subsequently included by Maradona in Argentina's 23-man squad for the 2010 FIFA World Cup. On 22 June, he made his FIFA World Cup debut when he came on the pitch in the 77th minute against Greece, replacing Sergio Agüero. Argentina won the match 2–0. On 27 June, he was again substituted on against Mexico in the 87th minute, this time replacing Maxi Rodríguez. Argentina won the match 3–1.

Pastore was included by manager Sergio Batista in Argentina's 23-man squad for the 2011 Copa América on home soil. Argentina were eliminated by eventual champions Uruguay on penalties in the quarter-finals.

Pastore scored his first senior international goal on 31 March 2015, in a 2–1 friendly win over Ecuador, at the MetLife Stadium, in New Jersey. Later that year, Pastore was selected by coach Gerardo Martino for the 2015 Copa América, and started in the team's opening fixture against Paraguay in La Serena. At the semi-final stage, Pastore scored the team's second goal and assisted Ángel Di María for the third as Argentina defeated Paraguay 6–1 to reach the tournament final. In the final against hosts Chile on 4 July, Pastore came off for Éver Banega in the 81st minute; following a 0–0 draw after extra-time, Chile claimed the title with a 4–1 penalty shoot-out victory.

In 2016, Pastore was included in Argentina's 23-man squad for the Copa América Centenario. Argentina went on to reach the final, only to lose out on penalties to Chile once again.

Style of play
An elegant, creative and technically gifted advanced playmaker, with excellent dribbling skills and close control, Pastore is capable of playing in several offensive roles, due to his ability to both score and create goals. Although he is usually deployed as an attacking midfielder due to his vision, passing and striking ability from distance, he is also capable of functioning as a winger, as a supporting striker or even as a forward, and has also been deployed in more withdrawn midfield roles on occasion, operating as a central midfielder, as a deep-lying playmaker, or even as a mezzala, due to his work-rate, creativity, skill, and physical attributes, despite his lack of notable pace. A talented, strong, quick and hard-working right-footed player, his playing style has drawn comparisons to Kaká, Zinedine Zidane, Zlatan Ibrahimović and one of his childhood idols, Enzo Francescoli, although Pastore has stated that his main influence is compatriot Juan Román Riquelme. Nicknamed "El Flaco" (like Francescoli before him) due to his tall, slender build, he was regarded as a highly promising player as a youngster, and in 2010, Don Balón named him as one of the 100 best young players in the world born after 1988. Despite his talent, however, he is known to be injury prone, and has also drawn criticism in the media for being inconsistent.

Career statistics

Club

International

Scores and results list Argentina's goal tally first, score column indicates score after each Pastore goal.

Honours
Paris Saint-Germain
 Ligue 1: 2012–13, 2013–14, 2014–15, 2015–16, 2017–18
 Coupe de France: 2016–17, 2017–18
 Coupe de la Ligue: 2013–14, 2014–15, 2015–16, 2016–17, 2017–18
 Trophée des Champions: 2013, 2014, 2016, 2017

Individual
Serie A Young Footballer of the Year: 2010
UNFP Ligue 1 Team of the Year: 2014–15
UNFP Ligue 1 Player of the Month: September 2011, November 2014, March 2015, April 2015

References

External links
 
 Sky Sports profile
 
 
 Profile at LegaSerieA 
 

1989 births
Living people
Footballers from Córdoba, Argentina
Argentine footballers
Association football midfielders
Argentina international footballers
2010 FIFA World Cup players
2011 Copa América players
2015 Copa América players
Copa América Centenario players
Talleres de Córdoba footballers
Club Atlético Huracán footballers
Palermo F.C. players
Paris Saint-Germain F.C. players
A.S. Roma players
Elche CF players
Argentine Primera División players
Serie A players
Ligue 1 players
La Liga players
Argentine people of Italian descent
Argentine expatriate footballers
Expatriate footballers in Italy
Expatriate footballers in France
Expatriate footballers in Spain
Argentine expatriate sportspeople in Italy
Argentine expatriate sportspeople in France
Argentine expatriate sportspeople in Spain